Hezekiah Sanford Bundy (August 15, 1817 – December 12, 1895) was a U.S. Representative from Ohio.

Biography
Born in Marietta, Ohio, Bundy moved with his parents to Athens County in 1819.
He attended the public schools.
He engaged in agricultural pursuits.
He studied law.
He was admitted to the bar in 1850 and practiced until 1860 when he became engaged in the iron business.
He served as member of the State house of representatives in 1848 and 1850.
He served in the State senate in 1855.
Presidential elector for Lincoln/Hamlin in 1860.
He was an unsuccessful candidate for election in 1862 to the Thirty-eighth Congress.

Bundy was elected as a Republican to the Thirty-ninth Congress (March 4, 1865 – March 3, 1867).
He declined to be a candidate for renomination in 1866.

Bundy was a trustee of Ohio University beginning in 1864.
Bundy was elected to the Forty-third Congress (March 4, 1873 – March 3, 1875).
He served as chairman of the Committee on Mileage (Forty-third Congress).
He was an unsuccessful candidate for reelection in 1874 to the Forty-fourth Congress.
He moved to Wellston, Jackson County, in 1887 and resumed the practice of law.

Bundy was elected to the Fifty-third Congress to fill the vacancy caused by the death of William H. Enochs and served from December 4, 1893, to March 3, 1895.
He died in Wellston, Ohio, December 12, 1895.
He was interred in the City Cemetery.

His daughter Julia Ann married Joseph B. Foraker, a prominent Ohio politician in the end of the 19th century and early 20th who served as governor of Ohio.

Sources

1817 births
1895 deaths
Republican Party members of the United States House of Representatives from Ohio
Politicians from Marietta, Ohio
Republican Party Ohio state senators
Republican Party members of the Ohio House of Representatives
People from Athens County, Ohio
People from Wellston, Ohio
Ohio lawyers
1860 United States presidential electors
Ohio University trustees
19th-century American politicians
19th-century American lawyers